Lewis Boys School, Pengam is a comprehensive school, founded in 1729 in the parish and village of Gelligaer and, later, moved to the nearby village of Gilfach, in the Rhymney Valley in South Wales. It was founded and funded by a legacy of Sir Edward Lewis of Gilfach Fargoed in the Parish of Gelligaer, a knight, landowner and captain of industry who died in 1728. It became comprehensive during the 1970s.

Location 

The building currently occupied by the school was opened in 2002, in Gilfach at the northern perimeter of one of its former Pengam sites. Before 2002, the campus was in Pengam, across two sites, with a bridge spanning the main road between them.  This bridge is still used to connect the new site to a collection of sports facilities located across the road.  A third site, at the former Graddfa Secondary Modern School in Ystrad Mynach, provided for around 300 younger secondary pupils between 1973 and 2002. This third site was purchased in 2003 by Ystrad Mynach College, whose Ystrad Mynach campus lies adjacent to the Graddfa site. Until circa 1848, the school was wholly located in Gelligaer.

History 

Lewis Boys School was established as a school for poor boys of the parish of Gelligaer, as can be seen from this extract of Sir Edward Lewis' will,

"That they in the first place out of the profitts of the 
Wood and premisses Build a School near the Church of the value of forty pounds And also 
every year after the Building of the said School that my said Trustees pay to a School Master 
yearly out of the rents and profitts of the said premisses the sume of ten pounds per annum 
and likewise that my said Trustees lay out fifteen pounds yearly for Coats and Caps for 
fifteen poor Boys of the said parish to be taught by the said Master to Read write and cast 
Accompt, And the rest of the profitts for the improving that Charity for the use of the said 
Master and Boys",

Lewis' School was originally a school for boys founded in a time when girls rarely received an education so no distinction of gender was needed in its title which was simply Lewis' School. So from modest beginnings the school was moved and enlarged, 1848, later to become a grammar school, though always maintaining the simple title, Lewis' School, eventually extending its catchment to other parishes, Bedwellty, Mynyddislwyn and St Ilans and more and more in the late 19th century to girls of those parishes.

The school is associated with Lewis' School for girls originally opened in Hengoed near Pengam in November 1900 but later moved to a new, larger facility in the town of Ystrad Mynach.

Both schools became comprehensive schools under subsequent educational reform.  Lewis School Pengam remains an all-male school until the end of year 11, as Lewis Girls' School remains an all-female school until the end of year 11.  However, both schools share a mixed-gender 6th Form Consortium for years 12 and 13.  Two other nearby schools, Heolddu Comprehensive School and Rhymney Comprehensive School, are also included in this consortium.

Both institutions during their times as grammar schools were renowned for consistently excellent standards of education and the high attainments of many of their pupils.

In 1986 the school was criticised by STOPP for its use of corporal punishment (caning), after an inspectors' report stated that 60 out of 360 boys in the lower school had been caned in the course of one year.

Trivia 

Once described by David Lloyd George as "the Eton College of the Valleys".

Notable former staff 

Alfred Evans (politician), headmaster, 1966–1968
Alun Lewis (poet), teacher
David Wynne (composer), teacher

Notable old Ludovicans
Wayne C Jenkins, Rugby Player, teacher and family man

 Paul Atherton, television and film producer
 Ray Bishop, footballer (Brighton, Cardiff and Newport County)
 Mervyn Burtch, composer
 Douglas Davies, theologian
 John Dawes, international rugby union player
 Bradley Dredge, professional golfer, European Tour winner
 Geoff Eales, jazz musician
 Iorwerth Evans, rugby player
 Jonathan Evans, politician
 Jonathan Evans, rugby player
 George Fisher, dramatist, director
 Julian Hodge, financier
 Peter Hubbard-Miles, politician
 E. John Hughes, diplomat and former H.M. Ambassador to Argentina.   
 Berwyn Jones, athlete, rugby player
 Humphrey Owen Jones, chemist and mountaineer
 Morgan Jones, politician and conscientious objector
 Thomas Jones, civil servant, academic and founder of Coleg Harlech
  Geoffrey Thomas, pastor
 Neil Kinnock, politician
 W. John Morgan, academic, Commonwealth Scholarship Commissioner, and Chair of the United Kingdom National Commission for UNESCO.
 Rev. Frederick A. G. Mudge, former Minor Canon at Llandaff Cathedral, Rector of Llandough with Leckwith and Hospital Chaplain, Vicar of All Saints, Penarth & Chaplain to the Welsh Guards Association
 Victor Erle Nash-Williams, Welsh archaeologist
 John O'Shea, international rugby union player
 Berwyn Price, athlete
 Craig Roberts, Welsh actor
 David Rocyn-Jones, medic, former president of the Welsh Rugby Union
 Richard Vaughan, badminton player, 2000 and 2004 Olympian
 Simon Weston, Falklands War veteran, charity worker
 Phil Williams, politician, scientist
 Zephaniah Williams, chartist campaigner; one of the leaders of the Newport revolt
 Sheep & Mash (Connor J. Ford & Joe Lloyd-Allen) music comedy act
 Ashley Thomas-Evans, Welsh actor
 REES Peter Maxwell;International rugby union player
 Morgan W.G.D.;International rugby union player
 Adam Wiktor Williams.; Professional Esports player (Rocket League)
 Jake Merriman.; Architect, noteworthy accomplishments: Ikea (Birmingham)

External links 
 Lewis School page

References
 The History of Lewis School Pengam; Sir Arthur Wright B.Sc.; published by the author, 1929

Secondary schools in Caerphilly County Borough
Educational institutions established in 1729
Boys' schools in Wales
1729 establishments in Wales